Glenn Richard Allison (born May 22, 1930) is a retired American professional ten-pin bowler who was a founding member of the Professional Bowlers Association (PBA).  He was born in Whittier, California, to Leo Allison, a car salesman, and Stella Bradford. He won five PBA Tour titles and one Senior PBA title, and was inducted into the PBA Hall of Fame (Veterans/Special Category) in 1984. He is also a member of the USBC Hall of Fame (inducted 1979), having won four titles in the ABC Tournament's Classic Division: he won in doubles in 1962, his "Eagles" team won in 1964 and 1966, and he claimed a singles title in 1970.

Professional career
Allison first made a name for himself as a team bowler of the 1950s, which included his time as a member of the Falstaffs of St. Louis with the likes of Harry Smith, Billy Welu, Dick Hoover, Buzz Fazio and Steve Nagy. In 1958, he was one of 33 bowlers who each donated $50 to help launch the Professional Bowlers Association after listening to a presentation by attorney and sports agent Eddie Elias. He won his first PBA title in 1962 and his fifth and final title in 1964. He won his lone PBA Senior Tour title in 1986.

PBA Tour titles
 1962 PBA Memphis Open (Memphis, TN)
 1962 Salt Lake PBA Open (Salt Lake City, UT)
 1963 Coca-Cola Tournament of the Stars (Midwest City, OK)
 1964 Tucson PBA Open (Tucson, AZ)
 1964 Oxnard PBA Open (Oxnard, CA)

PBA Senior Tour titles
 1986 PBA Kessler Senior Championship (Canton, OH)

900 series and related controversy
Allison became known in bowling circles for being the first American ten-pin bowler to roll a perfect 900 series (three perfect 300 games over a three-game series) in sanctioned competition. He rolled the series on July 1, 1982 in the Anchor Girl Trio League at La Habra Bowl in La Habra, California, but the then-American Bowling Congress (ABC) did not approve his award application, citing non-complying lane conditions. The decision sparked considerable controversy, as the ABC had sanctioned a 299 and 300 at the same bowling center earlier in the season, and no other scores that night were unusually high — even on the pair of lanes on which Allison bowled. But the ABC (now USBC) has never relented and stated in 2017 that it would not retroactively recognize the feat, citing that it would call into question all other rejected honor scores from that era. Allison himself was nonchalant following the most recent USBC decision, stating, "The bowling public recognizes me perhaps more (than) if it was sanctioned," adding that he's still saluted all over the world as the original "Mr. 900".

Personal
Allison has been married and divorced three times.

In the 1970s, Allison curtailed his PBA Tour participation and became the proprietor of Glenn Allison Lanes, located in Los Angeles near Los Angeles International Airport. At the time of his 900 series in 1982, he was working as a liquor store manager on Leffingwell Avenue in Whittier.

Just shy of his 86th birthday, Glenn was honored during the 2016 USBC Open Championships in Reno, Nevada, for becoming just the tenth bowler in history to make 65 lifetime appearances in the tournament. During the 2011 USBC Open Championships, Allison's 60th appearance, he became one of only 13 bowlers in history to reach a lifetime total of more than 100,000 pins in the event.

In December of 2017, Glenn was involved in an automobile accident. In addition to totaling his vehicle, he suffered from a fractured sternum and two fractured vertebrae. The accident occurred on Christmas Eve while Allison was driving to his part-time job as a front desk clerk at La Habra Bowl. His daughter Suzanne said he was recovering at Pomona Valley Hospital and "is determined to heal and get back to bowling."

External links
1982 Sports Illustrated article about Glenn Allison's 900 series
YouTube video of Glenn Allison's PBA Senior Tour win in 1986

References

American ten-pin bowling players
1930 births
Living people
Sportspeople from Whittier, California